, usually cited as Sin-Itiro Tomonaga in English, was a Japanese physicist, influential in the development of quantum electrodynamics, work for which he was jointly awarded the Nobel Prize in Physics in 1965 along with Richard Feynman and Julian Schwinger.

Biography
Tomonaga was born in Tokyo in 1906. He was the second child and eldest son of a Japanese philosopher, Tomonaga Sanjūrō. He entered the Kyoto Imperial University in 1926. Hideki Yukawa, also a Nobel laureate, was one of his classmates during undergraduate school. During graduate school at the same university, he worked as an assistant in the university for three years. In 1931, after graduate school, he joined Nishina's group in RIKEN. In 1937, while working at Leipzig University (Leipzig), he collaborated with the research group of Werner Heisenberg. Two years later, he returned to Japan due to the outbreak of the Second World War, but finished his doctoral degree (Dissertation PhD from University of Tokyo) on the study of nuclear materials with his thesis on work he had done while in Leipzig.

In Japan, he was appointed to a professorship in the Tokyo University of Education (a forerunner of Tsukuba University). During the war he studied the magnetron, meson theory, and his super-many-time theory. In 1948, he and his students re-examined a 1939 paper by Sidney Dancoff that attempted, but failed, to show that the infinite quantities that arise in QED can be canceled with each other. Tomonaga applied his super-many-time theory and a relativistic method based on the non-relativistic method of Wolfgang Pauli and Fierz to greatly speed up and clarify the calculations.  Then he and his students found that Dancoff had overlooked one term in the perturbation series.  With this term, the theory gave finite results; thus Tomonaga discovered the renormalization method independently of Julian Schwinger and calculated physical quantities such as the Lamb shift at the same time.

In 1949,  he was invited by Robert Oppenheimer to work at the Institute for Advanced Study in Princeton. He studied a many-body problem on the collective oscillations of a quantum-mechanical system. In the following year, he returned to Japan and proposed the Tomonaga–Luttinger liquid. In 1955, he took the leadership in establishing the Institute for Nuclear Study, University of Tokyo. In 1965, he was awarded the Nobel Prize in Physics, with Julian Schwinger and Richard P. Feynman, for the study of QED, specifically for the discovery of the renormalization method. He died of throat cancer in Tokyo in 1979.

Tomonaga was married in 1940 to Ryōko Sekiguchi. They had two sons and one daughter. He was awarded the Order of Culture in 1952, and the Grand Cordon of the Order of the Rising Sun in 1976.

In recognition of three Nobel laureates' contributions, the bronze statues of Shin'ichirō Tomonaga, Leo Esaki, and Makoto Kobayashi was set up in the Central Park of Azuma 2 in Tsukuba City in 2015.

Recognition
1946 – Asahi Prize
1948 – Japan Academy Prize
1951 – Member of the Japan Academy
1952 – Order of Culture
1964 – Lomonosov Gold Medal
1965 – Nobel Prize in Physics
1965 – elected to the United States National Academy of Sciences
1966 – elected to the American Philosophical Society 
1967 – Grand Cordon of the Order of the Rising Sun
1975 – elected to the American Academy of Arts and Sciences

Selected publications

Books

Articles

 Tomonaga, S. "On a Relativistically Invariant Formulation of the Quantum Theory of Wave Fields." Prog. Theor. Phys. 1, 27–42 (1946).
 Koba, Z., Tati, T. and Tomonaga, S. "On a Relativistically Invariant Formulation of the Quantum Theory of Wave Fields. II." Prog. Theor. Phys. 2, 101–116 (1947).
 Koba, Z., Tati, T. and Tomonaga, S. "On a Relativistically Invariant Formulation of the Quantum Theory of Wave Fields. III." Prog. Theor. Phys. 2, 198–208 (1947).
 Kanesawa, S. and Tomonaga, S. "On a Relativistically Invariant Formulation of the Quantum Theory of Wave Fields. IV." Prog. Theor. Phys. 3, 1–13 (1948).
 Kanesawa, S. and Tomonaga, S. "On a Relativistically Invariant Formulation of the Quantum Theory of Wave Fields. V." Prog. Theor. Phys. 3, 101–113 (1948).
 Koba, Z. and Tomonaga, S. "On Radiation Reactions in Collision Processes. I." Prog. Theor. Phys. 3, 290–303 (1948).
 Tomonaga, S. and Oppenheimer, J. R. "On Infinite Field Reactions in Quantum Field Theory." Phys. Rev. 74, 224–225 (1948).

See also
 List of Japanese Nobel laureates
 List of Nobel laureates affiliated with Kyoto University
 List of Nobel laureates affiliated with the University of Tokyo

References

Further reading

 
Tomonaga's Nobel Prize Lecture.

External links

  including the Nobel Lecture, May 6, 1966 Development of Quantum Electrodynamics
 Shinichiro Tomonaga
 Fundamental work in quantum electrodynamics, with deep-ploughing consequences for the physics of elementary particles.

1906 births
1979 deaths
Japanese physicists
Kyoto University alumni
Nobel laureates in Physics
Japanese Nobel laureates
Academic staff of Leipzig University
Recipients of the Order of Culture
Theoretical physicists
Foreign Members of the USSR Academy of Sciences
Foreign associates of the National Academy of Sciences
Institute for Advanced Study visiting scholars
Deaths from throat cancer
Deaths from cancer in Japan
Particle physicists
Riken personnel
Quantum physicists
Members of the Royal Swedish Academy of Sciences
Members of the American Philosophical Society